Leeds United Football Club were founded in October 1919, taking the place in the Midland League vacated by Leeds City Reserves, and were elected to The Football League for the 1920–21 season. They won the Second Division title four years later to gain promotion to the top tier of English football, but had to wait almost 50 years before winning any major silverware, with success in the 1968 Football League Cup Final accompanied by success in Europe in the final of the Inter-Cities Fairs Cup. The following season brought league success when Leeds won the First Division championship. Their success continued into the 1970s with victory in the 1971 Inter-Cities Fairs Cup Final, the 1972 FA Cup Final, another league title in the 1973–74 season and runners-up in the 1975 European Cup Final. Leeds won the Second Division title in the 1989–90 season and were promoted back to the First Division. A third league title in the 1991–92 season, a second FA Charity Shield in the 1992 FA Charity Shield and a semi-final appearance in the UEFA Champions League in 2001, preceded a period of turbulence which culminated in relegation to League One in the 2006–07 season. They dropped out of the top two tiers of English football for the first time in their history, in a season that saw them deducted ten points for going into administration. In 2010, Leeds United were promoted back into the Championship. Ten years later, in 2020, the club were promoted back to the Premier League after a 16-year absence.

Leeds United have won the League Championship three times, four Second Division titles, the FA Cup once, the EFL Cup once, the Charity Shield twice and the Inter-Cities Fairs Cup twice. All these honours were won under the management of either Arthur Fairclough, Don Revie, Howard Wilkinson and Marcelo Bielsa . The club have also been runners-up five times in the League Championship, three times in the FA Cup, once each in the EFL Cup, the Charity Shield, the Inter-Cities Fairs Cup, the Cup Winners' Cup and the European Cup, and lost the play-off to keep the Inter-City Fairs Cup trophy.

Seasons

Key

Key to league record:
Pld = Matches played
W = Matches won
D = Matches drawn
L = Matches lost
GF = Goals for
GA = Goals against
Pts = Points
Pos = Final position

Key to divisions:
Prem = Premier League
Champ = EFL Championship
Div 1 = Football League First Division
Lge 1 = EFL League One
Div 2 = Football League Second Division
ML = Midland League
n/a = Not applicable

Key to rounds:
DNE = Did not enter
PR = Preliminary round
R1 = Round 1
R2 = Round 2
R3 = Round 3
R4 = Round 4
R5 = Round 5
R6 = Round 6

Grp = Group stage
QF = Quarter-finals
NQF = Northern quarter-finals
SF = Semi-finals
NF = Northern final
RU = Runners-up
W = Winners

Division shown in bold to indicate a change in division.
Top scorers shown in bold are players who were also top scorers in their division that season.

Notes

References

External links

 (Covers periods from 1919 to 1968 and 1999 to 2007.)

Seasons
 
Leeds United